The 49th Infantry Division (49-ya Pekhotnaya Diviziya) was an infantry formation of the Russian Imperial Army.

Organization
1st Brigade
193rd Infantry Regiment
194th Infantry Regiment
2nd Brigade
195th Infantry Regiment
196th Infantry Regiment
49th Artillery Brigade

References

Infantry divisions of the Russian Empire
Military units and formations disestablished in 1918